Ormiston SWB Academy (formerly South Wolverhampton and Bilston Academy) is an academy school (11–18 years) serving the town of Bilston and the southern area of the city of Wolverhampton in the West Midlands of England.  On 1 July 2017 South Wolverhampton and Bilston Academy changed its name to Ormiston SWB Academy following a change of sponsor from the City of Wolverhampton Academy Trust to Ormiston Academies Trust (OAT).

It opened in September 2009 to replace Parkfield High School, which occupied a building at Bilston town centre and another at Lawnswood Avenue in the Lanesfield area of Wolverhampton. However, in September 2012, SWB Academy moved to a £25million new build in Bilston.

School Houses 
The academy's houses are Attwood, Brindley, Weston, Sanderson and Sixth (an exclusive form for 16-19 year old Sixth form students only). They are named after Richard Attwood, James Brindley, Simon Weston and Tessa Sanderson.

The school colours of the academy directly relate to its houses: Attwood is light blue, Brindley is dark purple, Weston is medium red, and Sanderson is light green.

External links
 The academy's website
 Information about the academy.

Academies in Wolverhampton
Secondary schools in Wolverhampton
Ormiston Academies